Head is the first full album by The Jesus Lizard.  It was released on Touch and Go Records in 1990. It was their first album to feature a drummer, Mac McNeilly.

Track listing
"One Evening" – 3:01
"S.D.B.J." – 2:27
"My Own Urine" – 3:08
"If You Had Lips" – 3:13
"7 vs. 8" – 3:35
"Pastoral" – 3:29
"Waxeater" – 2:09
"Good Thing" – 1:44
"Tight n' Shiny" – 2:11
"Killer McHann" – 2:16

CD version includes the Pure EP (1989):
"Blockbuster" – 3:29
"Bloody Mary" – 1:59
"Rabid Pigs" – 2:09
"Starlet" – 2:42
"Happy Bunny Goes Fluff-Fluff Along" ("Breaking Up Is Hard to Do") – 3:54

Personnel
 David Yow - lead vocals (all but 11)
 Duane Denison - guitars
 David Wm. Sims - bass, lead vocals (11)
 Mac McNeilly - drums (1-10)

Additional personnel 

 Suzy Korn - backing vocals (2)
 The Manger Mens Choir - backing vocals (7)

References

1990 debut albums
Touch and Go Records albums
The Jesus Lizard albums
Albums produced by Steve Albini